Gerber is a census-designated place (CDP) in Tehama County, California. The 2010 United States census reported Gerber's population was 1,060.

History
Gerber was platted in 1910, and named after the Gerber family, original owners of the town site. A post office has been in operation at Gerber since 1916. 

In the early years, Gerber was a center supporting ranchers and alfalfa growers.

Between 1916 and 1965, Gerber was the location of a division point on the Southern Pacific Railroad between the Sacramento and
Shasta Divisions.  Situated two miles north of the junction of the West Valley Line to Davis and the East Valley Line
to Sacramento via Chico and Marysville, facilities included steam locomotive fueling, repair and crew-change.   There were also livestock yards and an icing plant for refrigerator cars.    Following the 1955 completion of the railroad's phasing in of diesel locomotives as a replacement to steam, operations at Gerber were gradually curtailed over the following decade  and eventually closed down.  

Passenger service continued until 1972 when Amtrak's Coast Starlight discontinued Gerber station as a stop.

Geography
According to the United States Census Bureau, the CDP covers an area of 0.9 square miles (2.4 km2), all of it land.

Demographics

The 2010 United States Census reported that Gerber had a population of 1,060. The racial makeup of Gerber was 575 (54.2%) White, 6 (0.6%) African American, 55 (5.2%) Native American, 8 (0.8%) Asian, 0 (0.0%) Pacific Islander, 371 (35.0%) from other races, and 45 (4.2%) from two or more races. Hispanic or Latino of any race were 526 persons (49.6%).

The Census reported that 1,060 people (100% of the population) lived in households, 0 (0%) lived in non-institutionalized group quarters, and 0 (0%) were institutionalized.

There were 367 households, out of which 149 (40.6%) had children under the age of 18 living in them, 180 (49.0%) were opposite-sex married couples living together, 50 (13.6%) had a female householder with no husband present, 31 (8.4%) had a male householder with no wife present.  There were 35 (9.5%) unmarried opposite-sex partnerships, and 3 (0.8%) same-sex married couples or partnerships. 81 households (22.1%) were made up of individuals, and 27 (7.4%) had someone living alone who was 65 years of age or older. The average household size was 2.89.  There were 261 families (71.1% of all households); the average family size was 3.41.

The population was spread out, with 303 people (28.6%) under the age of 18, 111 people (10.5%) aged 18 to 24, 257 people (24.2%) aged 25 to 44, 271 people (25.6%) aged 45 to 64, and 118 people (11.1%) who were 65 years of age or older.  The median age was 34.0 years. For every 100 females, there were 105.0 males.  For every 100 females age 18 and over, there were 99.2 males.

The homeowner vacancy rate was 5.5%; the rental vacancy rate was 10.4%.  613 people (57.8% of the population) lived in owner-occupied housing units and 447 people (42.2%) lived in rental housing units.

References

Census-designated places in Tehama County, California
Census-designated places in California